The women's 800 metres at the 2004 Summer Olympics as part of the athletics program were held at the Athens Olympic Stadium from August 20 to 23.

The first round had split a full roster of runners into six heats with the first three gaining a direct qualification and then the next six fastest across all heats advancing to the semifinals. The top two runners in each of the three semifinal heats moved on directly to the final, and they were immediately joined by the next two fastest from any of the semifinals.

The final started with a fast first 200 metres, but Kelly Holmes and Maria de Lurdes Mutola were last at this stage.  As the pace slowed, Mutola and Holmes moved forward through the field.  The time at 400 metres was 56.37 seconds, with American Jearl Miles Clark leading.  They entered the finishing straight with Mutola taking the lead, before Holmes took the lead and held off Mutola to take gold.  Hasna Benhassi and Jolanda Čeplak finished strongly, both with a time of 1:56.43s, Benhassi winning silver in a photo finish. Mutola was forced into fourth place. Holmes' face lit up as she crossed the line, but then, unsure of the result, she anxiously waited for the times to come up.

Holmes had only decided to enter the 800 metres at the last moment, and went on to also win gold in her preferred event, the 1500 m.  This feat made her one of the UK's most successful ever athletes ; the Olympic 800–1500 metres double was never accomplished by any of their great 1980s middle distance trio, Sebastian Coe, Steve Ovett or Steve Cram.

Records
, the existing World and Olympic records were as follows.

No new records were set during the competition.

Qualification
The qualification period for athletics was 1 January 2003 to 9 August 2004. For the women's 800 metres, each National Olympic Committee was permitted to enter up to three athletes that had run the race in 2:00.00 or faster during the qualification period. If an NOC had no athletes that qualified under that standard, one athlete that had run the race in 2:01.30 or faster could be entered.

Schedule
All times are Eastern European Summer Time (UTC+3)

Results

Round 1
Qualification rule: The first three finishers in each heat (Q) plus the next six fastest overall runners (q) advanced to the semifinals.

Heat 1

Heat 2

Heat 3

Heat 4

Heat 5

Heat 6

Semifinals
Qualification rule: The top two finishers in each heat (Q) plus the next two fastest overall runners (q) advanced to the final.

Semifinal 1

Semifinal 2

Semifinal 3

Final

References

External links
 IAAF Athens 2004 Olympic Coverage

W
800 metres at the Olympics
2004 in women's athletics
Women's events at the 2004 Summer Olympics